Michael Paul Damus (born September 30, 1979) is an American actor. He is best known for his starring role as Marty DePolo on the ABC sitcom Teen Angel and co-starring in the film Lost in Yonkers. In addition, Damus also co-starred in Men, Women & Dogs and the TNT series Trust Me.

Filmography

References

External links

1979 births
Living people
20th-century American male actors
21st-century American male actors
Male actors from New York City
American male child actors
American male film actors
American male television actors
People from Queens, New York
University of California, Los Angeles alumni